Lomographa platyleucata is a moth in the family Geometridae first described by Francis Walker in 1866. It is found in China, Bhutan, India, Nepal and Taiwan.

The wingspan is about 42 mm.

Subspecies
Lomographa platyleucata platyleucata (India, Nepal)
Lomographa platyleucata asynapta (Wehrli, 1938) (China: Shaanxi)
Lomographa platyleucata marginata (Wileman, 1914) (Taiwan, China: Sichuan, Fujien)

References

Moths described in 1866
Lomographa
Moths of Asia